John Chisholm may refer to:
John Chisholm (archbishop of Melanesia) (1923–1975), Anglican bishop
John Chisholm (Vicar Apostolic of the Highland District) (1752–1814), Catholic bishop
John Chisholm (doctor), British general practitioner
Sir John Chisholm (executive) (born 1946), British chairman and chief executive
John Chisholm (police officer) (c. 1896–1958), Canadian police officer
John Edwin Chisholm (1882–1964), lawyer and politician in Saskatchewan, Canada
John T. Chisholm (born 1963), American prosecutor and current district attorney of Milwaukee County, Wisconsin
John Chisholm (soldier), 16th-century Scottish soldier and firework maker
John Alexander Chisholm (1859–1903), Canadian inventor and businessman

See also
Jack Chisholm (1924–1977), English footballer
John Chisum (1824–1884), cattle baron in the American West